Nam Ki-young (born July 10, 1962) is a South Korea football manager and former footballer who plays as a defender.

Club career
Nam Ki-young played only for POSCO Atoms.

International career
He was part of the South Korea squad  at the 1988 Summer Olympics.

Managerial career
He was manager of Cheongjudaesung High School since 1997

References

External links 
 

	

1962 births
Living people
Association football defenders
South Korean footballers
South Korea international footballers
Pohang Steelers players
K League 1 players
Footballers at the 1988 Summer Olympics
Olympic footballers of South Korea